The Serbian–Ottoman Wars, also known as the Serbian–Turkish Wars or Serbian Wars for Independence, were two consequent wars (1876–1877 and 1877–1878), fought between the Principality of Serbia and the Ottoman Empire. In conjunction with the Principality of Montenegro, Serbia declared war on the Ottoman Empire on 30 June 1876. By the intervention of major European powers, ceasefire was concluded in autumn, and the Constantinople Conference was organized. Peace was signed on 28 February 1877 on the basis of status quo ante bellum. After a brief period of formal peace, Serbia declared war on the Ottoman Empire on 11 December 1877. Renewed hostilities lasted until February 1878. Final outcome of wars was decided by the Congress of Berlin (1878). Serbia gained international recognition as an independent state, and its territory was expanded.

At the beginning of the conflict, the Serbian army was poorly trained and ill-equipped, unlike the troops of the Ottoman Empire. The offensive objectives the Serbian army sought to accomplish were overly ambitious for such a force, and they suffered a number of defeats that resulted from poor planning and chronically being spread too thin. This allowed Ottoman forces to repel the initial attacks of the Serbian army and drive them back. During the autumn of 1876, the Ottoman Empire continued their successful offensive which culminated in a victory on the heights above Đunis. During the second conflict, between 13 December 1877 and 5 February 1878, Serbian troops regrouped with help from Imperial Russia, who fought their own Russo-Turkish War. The Serbs formed five corps and attacked Ottoman troops to the south, taking the cities of Niš, Pirot, Leskovac and Vranje one after another. The war coincided with the Bulgarian uprising, the Montenegrin–Ottoman War and the Russo-Turkish War, which together are known as the Great Eastern Crisis of the Ottoman Empire.

Background and the opposing forces
In 1875, a revolt of Serbs broke out in Herzegovina, a province of the Ottoman Empire, which soon spread to other regions of the Vilayet of Bosnia, and in the spring of 1876 an uprising of Christian population also broke out in Bulgaria. Although the Ottoman Empire quickly suppressed the revolt in Bulgaria, the fighting in Herzegovina and Bosnia continued to drag on. In the same time, political instability in Turkish capital culminated on 30 May (1876) when sultan Abdülaziz was deposed and replaced with Murad V. Taking advantage of the opportunity, the two semi-independent principalities of Serbia and Montenegro opted for independence and declared war on the Ottoman Empire on 18 June 1876.

Forces
 
The main Serbian army under Commander-in-Chief Mikhail Chernyayev, a Russian general, concentrated at the Southern fortress of Aleksinac. It consisted of three Serbian divisions and a variety of volunteer formations totaling about 45,000 men. In the northeast, Milojko Lešjanin based at Zaječar commanded an infantry division (6,000) with cavalry support and the Bulgarian Legion (2,000). In the west there were two weak divisions (3,500 each), one in the southwest at Užice commanded by František Zach and one in the northwest at Šabac commanded by Ranko Alimpić. The main rifle was the Peabody M.1870 which had a performance similar to the M1867 Russian Krnka. Whilst the Peabody was the best weapon available to Serbian troops many had to make do with the erratic M.1867 Serbian Green conversion and other breechloaders, and even muzzleloaders (about 39,000 Russian musket model 1845/63 and 7,000 Belgian rifle model 1849/56). Officers were armed with Francotte Revolver m/1871. Artillery batteries contained a variety of mostly bronze guns almost all inferior to the Ottoman Krupps. There were very few cavalry squadrons reflecting the nature of the terrain and those which existed were poorly equipped. At that time Serbia was accepting all volunteers; there were many volunteers from different countries, including Russians, Bulgarians, Italian followers of Giuseppe Garibaldi and Prussian officers, and also Englishmen, Frenchmen, Greeks, Romanians and Poles. The biggest detachments were those of the Russians and Bulgarians. During the war of 1876–1877, on the initiative of Garibaldi, a detachment was created consisting of several hundreds of Italian volunteers. Russian volunteer detachments formally independent of the Russian state stood up in defense of Serbia. The biggest number of Russian volunteers fought in the Timok-Morava Army, their number reaching around 2,200, out of which there were 650 officers and 300 medical personnel.

The main Ottoman army was based at Sofia under Abdul Kerim with 50,000 men plus irregulars (bashi-bazouk) and Circassians. There was a garrison at the border fortress of Niš commanded by Mehmed Ali with 8,000 men. At Vidin, Osman Nuri had 23,000 men. In the west, in the Sanjak of Bosnia, there were small garrisons at Bijeljina and Zvornik with a larger force (12,000 mostly Egyptians) organized in three infantry regiments under the command of Hosni Rashid Pasha (Egyptian Army) and Dervish Pasha and Mehmed Ali. Substantial numbers of Redif troops were called up for this war mostly armed with former British Sniders. The superior Peabody–Martini was becoming more widely available and was certainly used by the Egyptian troops. Krupp breechloaders are most frequently mentioned although there must have been significant numbers of bronze guns. Ottoman troops performed well during the war albeit badly officered and inadequately supplied.

Operations

First War (1876–1877) 

The first phase, known as the First Serbian–Ottoman War (/), took place between 30 June 1876 and 28 February 1877. The Serbian government declared war on the Ottoman Empire on the symbolic Vidovdan (June 27), the day of the Battle of Kosovo (1389). (Although, the battle took place on June 15 in the 14th century and it did not need transition to the Gregorian Calendar. Even in the case of such transition, the correct date had to be June 23, as the difference in the 14th century should be 8 days.) The initial Serbian military plan was to defend Niš and attack Sofia with the main army under Chernyayev. Other armies would simultaneously launch diversionary attacks, but these were repulsed in the west. In the north-east, general Milojko Lešjanin was defeated near Kior after failing to hold the Ottoman advance over the Timok river. Although he withdrew to the fortress at Saicar, the Ottoman army captured it on 7 August 1876. The Serbian army's main advance in the south appeared to initially meet with success when it moved quickly down the Nišava valley and captured the important heights at Babina Glava, north of Pirot. They were forced to withdraw, however, when the Ottomans responded by sending two columns under Suleiman and Hafiz to flank the Serbian position. General Ranko Alimpić crossed the Drina in July 1876 but was unsuccessful in capturing Bijeljina.

The Ottoman commander Abdul Kerim decided against marching over the difficult mountain terrain between the Timok and Morava rivers and instead concentrated 40,000 troops at Niš and advanced up the easier country of the Morava valley towards Aleksinac. Chernyayev had less than 30,000 men, and unlike the Ottoman commander he stretched them thinly across both sides of the Morava river and into the mountains. Consequently, when contact was made between the two forces, the Serbian troops were overwhelmed by massed Ottoman firepower. A bayonet charge shortly followed and routed the Serbian troops from the field. Thanks to Abdul Kerim's indecisiveness and the arrival of Horvatović's fresh forces, a new Serbian defensive line was created at Djunis.

Following this string of setbacks and defeats, Serbia petitioned the European powers to mediate a diplomatic solution to the war. A joint ultimatum from the European powers forced the Ottoman Empire into accepting a one-month truce with Serbia, during which peace negotiations were held. The Ottoman Empire's peace conditions were deemed by the European powers as too harsh, however, and were rejected.

When the truce expired, the war continued and the new Serbian commander, Horvatović, attacked the Ottoman positions along a broad front from Djunis to Aleksinac on 28 September 1876, but the Ottoman troops repulsed the attacks. The Ottoman forces reorganized and regrouped, and on 19 October 1876 the army of Adyl Pasha launched a surprise attack on the Serbian right which forced the Serbians back to Deligrad.

On 31 October 1876, with the situation becoming dire and Serbian forces about to collapse, Russia mobilized its army and threatened to declare war on the Ottoman Empire if they did not sign a truce with Serbia and renew the peace negotiations within forty-eight hours. These negotiations lasted until 15 January 1877 and effectively ended the fighting between Serbia and the Ottoman Empire until Serbia, having gained financial backing from Russia, again declared war against the Ottoman Empire in 1877.

Second War (1877–1878) 

The second phase, known as the Second Serbian–Ottoman War (/), took place between 13 December 1877 and 5 February 1878. It ended in Serbian victory.

By early 1878, the Royal Serbian Army had captured most of the South Morava basin, reaching as far as Preševo and Vitina. On 31 January they took Vranje.

Aftermath
Many children were orphaned as a result of the Serbo-Turkish Wars. The situation in Serbia was very serious, described by some as “children in huge groups reaching towns”. At that time Serbia had underdeveloped social care system. Being aware of all that, 50 most prominent citizens of Belgrade decided to establish the “Society for the bringing up and protection of children”, in the Kasina Hotel on Terazije Square, in 1879. In this facility the first vocational school in Serbia was established.

During and after the Serbian–Ottoman War of 1876–1878, between 30,000 and 70,000 Ottoman loyalists, mostly Albanians, has fled before the Serbian army from the former Sanjak of Niș to the Turkish Vilayet of Kosovo.

Legacy
 In 1876, Pyotr Ilyich Tchaikovsky composed and orchestrated the ″Marche slave″.
 At the close of Tolstoy's 1877 novel Anna Karenina, the character of Count Aleksey Vronsky enlists in a Russian volunteer regiment traveling to the aid of the Serbians.
 In 1882, Laza K. Lazarević (1851–91), wrote the short story The People Will Reward All of This. The author describes the difficult position of disabled war veterans after returning from the battlefield and inhuman attitude of the state towards them.

Gallery

See also

Expulsion of the Albanians 1877–1878

References

Sources

 
 Forbes, Nevill, et al. The Balkans: a history of Bulgaria, Serbia, Greece, Rumania, Turkey (1915) summary histories by scholars online free
 Harris, David. A diplomatic history of the Balkan crisis of 1875-1878: the first year (1969).
 Kovic, Milos. Disraeli and the Eastern Question (Oxford UP, 2010).
 Langer, William L.  European Alliances and Alignments, 1871-1890 (2nd ed. 1950) pp 121–66.
 Macfie, Alexander Lyon. The Eastern Question 1774-1923 (2nd ed. 2014).
 Millman, Richard. Britain and the Eastern question, 1875-1878 (Oxford UP, 1979).

Other languages

External links
 (Public domain)

Conflicts in 1877
1870s in the Ottoman Empire
1870s in Serbia
 
Conflicts in 1876
Conflicts in 1878
Russia–Serbia relations